Livingston is a county constituency of the House of Commons of the Parliament of the United Kingdom, to which it returns one Member of Parliament (MP). Elections are held using the first-past-the-post voting system.

It was formed from parts of traditional Midlothian and West Lothian for the 1983 general election. A similar constituency, also called Livingston, was used by the Scottish Parliament until 2011. In 2005 a small part of the Linlithgow constituency was moved into Livingston.

Boundaries 

1983–1997: The West Lothian District electoral divisions of Broxburn, Calders, Livingston North, and Livingston South; and the City of Edinburgh District ward of Kirkliston.

1997–2005: The West Lothian District electoral divisions of Broxburn/Uphall, Craigshill/Ladywell, Deans/Knightsridge, Dedridge/West Calder, and Murieston/East Calder.

2005–present: The area of the West Lothian Council other than that part in the Linlithgow and East Falkirk constituency.

The constituency covers the eastern portion of the West Lothian council area, and is dominated by Livingston. It is bordered by the constituencies of Edinburgh West, Edinburgh South West, Dumfriesshire, Clydesdale and Tweeddale, Lanark and Hamilton East, Airdrie and Shotts, and Linlithgow and East Falkirk.

Members of Parliament 
The Member of Parliament for this seat had been Robin Cook of the Labour Party since its creation in 1983.  Following his death on 6 August 2005 a by-election was held on 29 September, and Jim Devine was elected.  On 8 February 2010 Devine was suspended from the Labour Party after he was charged with a criminal offence in relation to his parliamentary expenses. He was succeeded in 2010 by Labour's Graeme Morrice. Morrice was defeated by Hannah Bardell of the Scottish National Party (SNP) five years later.

Election results

Elections in the 2010s

Elections in the 2000s

Elections in the 1990s

Elections in the 1980s

See also 
List of UK Parliamentary constituencies in Scotland

References

External links
Election result, by-election 2005
Election result, 2005 (BBC)
Election results, 1997 - 2001 (BBC)
Election results, 1992 - 2005 (Guardian)
Richard Kimber's Political Science Resources (1983 and 1987 results)

Westminster Parliamentary constituencies in Scotland
Constituencies of the Parliament of the United Kingdom established in 1983
Politics of West Lothian